Tobeler (Töbölör) is a rural locality (a selo) in Kosh-Agachsky District, the Altai Republic, Russia. The population was 915 as of 2016. There are 14 streets.

Geography 
Tobeler is located 17 km southeast of Kosh-Agach (the district's administrative centre) by road. Zhana-Aul and Kosh-Agach are the nearest rural localities.

References 

Rural localities in Kosh-Agachsky District